Velikiy Ustyug Airport  is an airport in Russia located  north of Velikiy Ustyug. It is a small civilian airfield with a parking apron and a few buildings.

The airport can accept only small aircraft. There is occasional passenger service to Vologda.

There were plans to reconstruct Veliky Ustyug Airport, making it an international airport and accessible for large aircraft.

Airlines and destinations

As of July 2022, the only previously scheduled service by Severstal Air Company to Cherepovets has been terminated.

References

External links

Airports built in the Soviet Union
Airports in Vologda Oblast